The Blair–Brown deal (or Granita Pact) was a gentlemen's agreement struck between the British Labour Party politicians Tony Blair and Gordon Brown in 1994, while they were Shadow Home Secretary and Shadow Chancellor of the Exchequer respectively.

Deal
It is widely believed that the two met in the restaurant Granita in Islington, London, following the unexpected death of the Labour Leader John Smith on 12 May of that year. They agreed that Brown would not stand in the forthcoming Labour leadership election, so as to allow Blair a better chance of easy victory, and in return Blair would appoint Brown Chancellor of the Exchequer upon Labour's presumptive victory. In government Brown would be granted unprecedented powers over domestic policy, which would make him the most powerful Chancellor in British history.

It is also widely believed that Blair agreed, if he were appointed Prime Minister, to stay in the job for only two terms and then resign in Brown's favour. Blair later led Labour to a landslide victory in the 1997 general election, and Brown became Chancellor with wider powers and the "formidable autonomy" as promised to him. In 2007, as Blair had allegedly predicted, Brown became Blair's successor following Blair's resignation, though he served three terms instead of two. The existence of any deal was denied for many years by both men.

Disputes
The existence of the deal was publicly dismissed by Blair, Brown and many of their associates for several years, prompting much speculation as to what, if anything, was agreed.

The Guardian published a written note in June 2003 which, it said, outlined the policy areas proposed by Brown that Blair would commit to as part of the deal, namely a "fairness agenda" consisting of "social justice, employment opportunities and skills" under a Labour Government.

In October 2003, columnist Tom Brown told the BBC that Brown had informed him of the deal the day after it had been made. Tom Brown said to BBC Radio Scotland:

I'm in absolutely no doubt there was a deal since Gordon phoned me the morning after it was made and told me about it.  But at the same time I also believe that both men left the restaurant with a different version of the deal in their minds. They hadn't actually written it down on paper. Gordon believed Blair would step down about now actually, and Blair believed that he... hadn't committed himself to any timetable.
An episode of Dispatches in May 2007, entitled "Gordon Brown: Fit For Office?" reported that Brown felt betrayed after losing support from Peter Mandelson and other friends and that this lack of support, rather than any deal, made him decide not to run for the leadership.

An account of the pact between the two politicians was presented in detail in the book of 2001, The Rivals: The Intimate Story of a Political Marriage, written by BBC journalist James Naughtie.

The relationship between Blair and Brown from the years 1983 to 1994 – culminating in an in depth dramatisation of the Granita meeting – was the focus of a 2003 made-for-television film directed by Stephen Frears and written by Peter Morgan, based in part upon Naughtie's book. The film, titled The Deal, starred Michael Sheen as Blair and David Morrissey as Brown.

A caption in the opening titles (directly inspired – according to Frears – by the identical epigraph at the start of the film of 1969, Butch Cassidy and the Sundance Kid) informed viewers that "much of what follows is true".

Location 
In a televised interview with Piers Morgan in February 2010, Brown admitted that he deferred contesting the Labour leadership and that Blair had promised to hand over power to him at a later point, but that the two men later fought bitterly after – from Brown's perspective – Blair failed to keep to his end of the bargain. Brown also stated that the deal had not been made in Granita but had been struck before the men met in the restaurant. In his 2017 book My Life, Our Times, Brown again described the Granita dinner as "a formality" that merely confirmed what the two had previously discussed and agreed.

In her autobiography, Cherie Blair writes that the deal took place at a neighbour's home, not at Granita. In an interview with Peter Hennessy on BBC Radio 4, Tony Blair claimed that the agreement had been struck '...in a couple of different places in Edinburgh', claiming that by the time they dined at Granita, minds had been made up as to what was going to happen.

See also

 Kirribilli agreement – a similar pact in Australian politics
 Premiership of Tony Blair
 The Deal (2003 film) – a dramatisation of the events

References

Tony Blair
Gordon Brown
New Labour
1994 in British politics
May 1994 events in the United Kingdom
History of the London Borough of Islington